The 2021 Asian Table Tennis Championships was a table tennis tournament held in Doha, Qatar, from 28 September to 5 October.

China did not compete at the event due to a focus on the 2021 National Games of China and the 2021 World Table Tennis Championships as well as travel and quarantine restrictions as a result of the COVID-19 pandemic.

Medal summary

Events

Medal table

References

2021 Asian Table Tennis Championships
Asian Table Tennis Championships
Asian Table Tennis Championships
Table tennis competitions in Qatar
Asian Table Tennis Championships
Asian Table Tennis Championships